Phillip Thiel (born October 29, 1984) is a former American rugby union player who currently coaches Atlanta Old White rugby football Club and played for Life University Men's Senior Rugby Club in the American Rugby Premiership as a hooker and prop.

Club career
After taking nearly 18 months off, Thiel returned to play for Life University for the 2013 Division 1 and Elite Cup Series and was selected to represent Life University rugby at the Rugby Showdown against the Golden Lions as a member of the North American All-Stars before the event was canceled. In August 2014 Thiel signed a short-term deal with Saracens.

International career
His debut with the Eagles was in November 2009 against Uruguay. He was selected to play with the USA Eagles  for the 2011 and 2015 World Cups. Thiel co-captained the USA Eagles Select team at the 2013 Americas Rugby Championship where the Eagles finished second.

References
 http://rugbymag.com/international-news/7560-north-american-all-stars-named.html
 http://rugbymag.com/super-league-/7589-life-big-over-boston-in-elite-cup-opener.html

External links
 Player Profile USA Rugby
 Player Profile via PRM Rugby
 Player Profile eaglesxv.com

1984 births
Living people
American rugby union players
United States international rugby union players
Rugby union hookers
Rugby union props